Małgorzata Walewska (born 5 July 1965) is a Polish opera singer, dramatic mezzo-soprano.

Biography

Education 

Born in Warsaw, Poland, Małgorzata Walewska graduated from the Fryderyk Chopin Academy of Music under the tutelage of Halina Słonicka. She is a laureate and finalist of many international competitions, such as Alfredo Kraus in Las Palmas., Luciano Pavarotti in Philadelphia, Belvedere in Vienna and Stanisław Moniuszko in Warsaw.

Operatic career 

During her studies, in 1991 Walewska debuted as Aza in Manru at the Polish National Opera. Her next engagements included Bremen Theater and the Vienna State Opera where she debuted as Polina in The Queen of Spades followed by performances of Carmen, Maddalena in Rigoletto, Olga in Eugene Onegin, Pierotto in Linda di Chamounix. There, for the first time, she worked with such great artists as Luciano Pavarotti and Plácido Domingo. The following years brought her engagements at the Semperoper in Dresden, where she performed the part of Ms. Quickly in  Falstaff, and Ulrica in Un ballo in maschera (1999), and at the Deutsche Oper Berlin, again as Ms. Quickly,  as Amneris in Aida, and for the first time as Azucena in Il trovatore. In 2006 Walewska debuted at the Metropolitan Opera in New York as Dalila in Samson et Dalila, where José Cura was her stage partner. At the Metropolitan Opera Walewska also sung the parts of Santuzza and Amneris. In 2006 she also sung the role of  Eboli in Don Carlos  on the stage of the New National Theater in Tokyo. In 2007 she came back to the Deutsche Oper Berlin to sing the title role in Cassandra, and again in 2011 to sing Dalila. Other important debuts on international stages were Azucena at the Royal Opera House in Covent Graden (2009), Amme in Die Frau ohne Schatten at the Palacio de Bellas Artes in Mexico City (2012) and Dalila at the Grand Théâtre de Genève (2012), where the orchestra was conducted by Michel Plasson. In 2015 she added the part of Kundry in Richard Wagner's Parsifal at the Poznań Grand Theatre and sung the role of Countess in The Queen of Spades at the Opéra national du Rhin in Strassburg. In 2016 Walewska had her role debut as the Widow in Władysław Żeleński's opera Goplana at the Polish National Opera. The production won an Award for Rediscovered Work at the 2017 International Opera Awards. In June 2018, the artist performed the part of Mistress Quickly at the Cologne Opera.

Concert career 

Małgorzata Walewska has a very rich concert repertoire. She often gives recitals with the accompaniment of piano or harp. Her program includes songs of Polish and international composers such as G. Fauré, F. Schubert, S. Moniuszko, K. Szymanowski, F. Chopin, or P. Tchaikovsky, as well as song cycles such as Les nuits d'été by H. Berlioz or Wesendonck Lieder by  R. Wagner. Since 2013 she sings French song repertoire, such as for example songs of R. Hahn, to the accompaniment of a harp played by Małgorzata Zalewska.

Recordings and awards 

Małgorzata Walewska recorded numerous CDs, starting with pieces which belong to her usual repertoire (e.g. Voce di donna published by Sony Classical), through Christmas Carols (Christmas Time - Traditional Polish Christmas Carols published by DUX), Crossover arrangements (Walewska and Friends issued by DUX, or Mezzo by Sony Music Poland CD), arias of G.F. Händel's, and religious and organ pieces (Farny issued by DUX). 
On the list of the American magazineTime in 1999, she was included among the ten most famous Poles as "one of the stars that illuminate the way for Poland in the next millennium". In a ranking Pearls of the Polish Economy 2008 she was awarded with Honorary Pearl in the culture category, for promoting Polish culture in the world. In October 2016, Małgorzata Walewska has received a Gloria Artis medal of the highest class in recognition of her tremendous contribution to Polish culture. It is the most prestigious decoration bestowed by the Polish Ministry of Culture and National Heritage. In the 2017/2018 season Małgorzata Walewska has recorded W. Kilar's Missa pro pace with Podlaska Philharmonic Orchestra under the baton of Mirosław Jacek Błaszczyk as well as the part of Jochebed, the mother of Moses in A. Rubinstein's religious opera Moses with Polish Sinfonia Iuventus Orchestra under the baton of Michail Jurowski.

Other engagements 

Since 2014 she is one of the Juries in a popular TV show Twoja twarz brzmi znajomo (polish version of Your Face Sounds Familiar). In 2015, Małgorzata Walewska was nominated Artistic Director of the Ada Sari  International Vocal Artistry Festival and Competition held in Nowy Sącz, Poland.

Private life 

Małgorzata Walewska currently lives in Warsaw in Poland. She has one daughter, Alicja Kokosińska, who is a promising young set designer.

Repertoire

Opera 
 Béla Bartók, A kékszakállú herceg vára, Judit
 Georges Bizet, Carmen, Carmen
 Hector Berlioz, La damnation de Faust, Marguerite
 Vittorio Gnecchi, Cassandra, Cassandra
 Pietro Mascagni, Cavalleria rusticana, Santuzza
 Jules Massenet, Werther, Charlotte
 Claudio Monteverdi, L'incoronazione di Poppea, Arnalta
 Ignacy Jan Paderewski, Manru, Aza
 Amilcare Ponchielli, La Gioconda, La Cieca
 Camille Saint-Saëns, Samson et Dalila, Dalila
 Richard Strauss, Die Frau ohne Schatten, Die Amme
 Igor Stravinsky, Oedipus Rex, Jocasta
 Pyotr Ilyich Tchaikovsky, Eugene Onegin, Olga
 Pyotr Ilyich Tchaikovsky, The Queen of Spades, Polina, Countess
 Giuseppe Verdi, Aida, Amneris
 Giuseppe Verdi, Don Carlos, Princess Eboli
 Giuseppe Verdi, Falstaff, Mistress Quickly
 Giuseppe Verdi, Il trovatore, Azucena
 Giuseppe Verdi, Nabucco, Fenena
 Giuseppe Verdi, Rigoletto, Maddalena
 Giuseppe Verdi, Un ballo in maschera, Ulrica
 Richard Wagner, Parsifal, Kundry

Oratorio 

 Johann Sebastian Bach, Magnificat
 Ludwig van Beethoven, Symphony No. 9
 Anton Bruckner, Te Deum
 Gustav Mahler, Symphonies No. 2 and 3
 Wolfgang Amadeus Mozart, Coronation Mass
 Giovanni Battista Pergolesi, Stabat Mater
 Gioachino Rossini, Stabat Mater
 Gioachino Rossini, Petite messe solennelle
 Giuseppe Verdi, Messa da Requiem

Discography 

 1993 – Gala Lirica Vol.1; Orquesta Sinfónica y Coro de RTVE - Habanera from G. Bizet's Carmen (recording from the laureate concert of Spanish Competitions in Madrid)
 1995 – Te Deum; A.Bruckner - C.Gounod
 2000 – first solo recording Voce Di Donna
 2000 – Mezzo 
 2001 – Guest appearance on the CD Ave Maria - Najpiękniejsze Pieśni Maryjne – utwory „Ave Maria” i „Zdrowaś Maryja” - Małgorzata Walewska was awarded by the Field Bishop with a Milito pro Christo medal for an outstanding interpretation of Ave Maria. The album quickly reached platinum status
 2001 – CD with the soundtrack for the movie Quo Vadis and Jerzy Kawalerowicz's song promoting the film - Dove Vai - another CD with platinum status
 2002 – Guest appearance on a CD of the band I Muvrini - Umani; the song Erein eta joan
 2004 – Walewska and Friends - double album issued by Dux, it was distinguished with the Ace of Empik- an award for the best selling album 
 2007 – Szymanowski, Wagner Songs – Małgorzata Walewska and Oskar Jezior
 2009 – Farny - Małgorzata Walewska and Robert Grudzień - album recorded in July 2009 in a church in Kazimierz Dolny
 2011 – Christmas Time - Traditional Polish Christmas Carols - CD with traditional Polish Christmas Carols
 2012 – Mezzo - reedition of Małgorzata Walewska's CD Mezzo enriched by the song Dove Vai with participation of Fiolka and Michał Bajor
 2014 – The Spirit of Tango - an album with live arecording of a concert with the participation of Martín Palmeri – piano, Mario Stefano Pietrodarchi – bandoneon, Amadeus Polish Radio Chamber Orchestra and the Chamber Choir of the Adam Mickiewicz University in Poznań
 2017 - Wojciech Kilar: Missa pro pace - a recording of Wojciech Kilar's "Missa pro pace" with Podlaska Philharmonic Orchestra under the baton of Mirosław Jacek Błaszczyk

References

External links

Małgorzata Walewska – studiokultura
Strona główna / Międzynarodowy Festiwal i Konkurs Sztuki wokalnej im. Ady Sari
Małgorzata Walewska
Małgorzata Walewska
Małgorzata Walewska | Życie i twórczość | Artysta
Małgorzata Walewska
Malgorzata Walewska, mezzo

Operatic mezzo-sopranos
1965 births
Chopin University of Music alumni
Musicians from Warsaw
Living people
20th-century Polish women opera singers
21st-century Polish women opera singers